Tabriz, Osku and Azarshahr (electoral district) is the biggest electoral district in the East Azerbaijan Province of Iran. This electoral district has a population of nearly 2 million and elects 6 members of parliament. In the  first legislative election (1980), this electoral district had 7 MPs, but from 1984 it has had 6.

1980
MPs in 1980 from the electorate of Tabriz. (1st)
 Hosein Pourmirghaffari
 Abbas Dozdozani
 Mohammad Hosein Chehreghani-Anzabi
 Mohammad Ali Sobhan Elahi
 Abolfazl Seyyed-Reyhani
 Mohammad Alinejad
 Mohammad Milani-Hoseini

1984
MPs in 1984 from the electorate of Tabriz. (2nd)
 Javad Anghaji
 Akbar Parhizghar
 Mohammad Hosein Chehreghani-Anzabi
 Abolfazl Seyyed-Reyhani
 Morteza Razavi
 Mohammad Ali Sobhan Elahi

1988
MPs in 1988 from the electorate of Tabriz. (3rd)
 Hosein Pourmirghaffari
 Hamid Chitchian
 Mohammad Hosein Chehreghani-Anzabi
 Mohammad Ali Sobhan Elahi
 Ali-Ashraf Abdollah Porihoseini
 Hashem Hashemzadeh

1992
MPs in 1992 from the electorate of Tabriz. (4th)
 Fakhrtaj Amir-Shaqaqi
 Esmaeil Jabbarzadeh
 Javad Anghaji
 Mohammad Ali Sobhan Elahi
 Mohammad Alinejad
 Fatemeh Homayun-Moghaddam

1996
MPs in 1996 from the electorate of Tabriz, Osku and Azarshahr. (5th)
 Hamid Bagheri
 Esmaeil Jabbarzadeh
 Belal Samarghandi
 Samad Ghasempour
 Mohammad Milani-Hoseini
 Hashem Hashemzadeh

2000
MPs in 2000 from the electorate of Tabriz, Osku and Azarshahr. (6th)
 Akbar A'lami
 Esmaeil Jabbarzadeh
 Ali-Ashraf Abdollah Porihoseini
 Ali-Asghar Sherdost
 Hamid Seyyed Mahdavi-Aghdam
 Mir-Taher Mousavi

2004
MPs in 2004 from the electorate of Tabriz, Osku and Azarshahr. (7th)
 Akbar A'lami
 Esmaeil Jabbarzadeh
 Reza Rahmani
 Mohammad Hosein Farhanghi
 Mohammad Reza Mirtajodini
 Eshrat Shayeq

2008
MPs in 2008 from the electorate of Tabriz, Osku and Azarshahr. (8th)
 Alireza Mondi Sefidan
 Masoud Pezeshkian
 Reza Rahmani
 Mohammad Hosein Farhanghi
 Mohammad Reza Mirtajodini
 Shakur Akbarnejad

2012
MPs in 2012 from the electorate of Tabriz, Osku and Azarshahr. (9th)
 Alireza Mondi Sefidan
 Masoud Pezeshkian
 Reza Rahmani
 Mohammad Esmaeil Saeidi
 Mohammad Hosein Farhanghi
 Mir-Hadi Gharaseyyed Romiani

2016

First round

Second round

Notes

 Spokesman Guardian Council, Siamak Rahpeyk: After a recount of votes in the constituency, "Tabriz, Osku, Azarshahr" fourth with the fifth changed.

References

Electoral districts of East Azerbaijan
Azarshahr County
Tabriz County
Osku County
Deputies of Tabriz, Osku and Azarshahr